Boyd Blake Rice (born December 16, 1956) is an American experimental sound/noise musician using the name of NON since the mid-1970s, archivist, actor, photographer, author, member of the Partridge Family Temple religious group, co-founder of the UNPOP art movement and former staff writer for the formerly defunct but now active Modern Drunkard magazine.

Biography
Rice became widely known through his involvement in V. Vale's RE/Search Publications. He is profiled in RE/Search #6/7: Industrial Culture Handbook and Pranks! In Pranks, Rice described his experience in 1976 when he tried to give President Ford's wife, Betty Ford, a skinned sheep's head. In this interview, he emphasized the consensus nature of reality and the havoc that can be wreaked by refusing to play by the collective rules that dictate most people's perception of the external world.

In the mid-1980s Rice became close friends with Anton LaVey, founder and high priest of the Church of Satan, and was made a priest, then later a magister in the Council of Nine of the Church. The two admired much of the same music and shared a similar misanthropic outlook. Each had been inspired by Might Is Right in fashioning various works: LaVey in his seminal Satanic Bible and Rice in several recordings.

Rice's Social Darwinist outlook eventually led to him founding the Social Darwinist think tank called The Abraxas Foundation, along with co-founder Nikolas Schreck. The organization promotes authoritarianism, totalitarianism, misanthropism, and elitism, is antidemocratic, and has some philosophical overlap with the Church of Satan.

Rice has documented the writings of Charles Manson in his role as contributing editor of The Manson File. Rice was a featured guest on Talk Back, a radio program hosted by the Evangelical Christian Bob Larson. In total, Rice made five appearances on Larson's program. During an interview, Rice described the basic philosophy of his foundation as being "The strong rule the weak, and the clever rule the strong".

Although Rice was sometimes reported to possess the world's largest Barbie collection, he confessed in a 2003 interview with Brian M. Clark to owning only a few.

In 2000, along with Tracy Twyman, editor of Dagobert's Revenge, Rice filmed a special on Rennes-le-Château for the program In Search of... on Fox television. (The segment was later included in the 2002 version of In Search of... on the Sci Fi Channel.) Rice has done extensive research into Gnosticism as well as Grail legends and Merovingian lore, sharing this research in Dagobert's Revenge and The Vessel of God.  There is controversy regarding Boyd Rice's authorship and the authenticity of his contributions about Gnosticism and the Esoteric in writings during the phase with Tracy R. Twyman.  There are letters which surfaced on the internet after Tracy's death, where she states that Boyd Rice took credit for her ideas, and that Tracy wrote the materials which Boyd Rice claimed for both Dagobert's Revenge and The Vessel of God.  The website davincicodecoded.com [official website for Da Vinci Code Decoded by Martin Lunn] contains references to these letters regarding the authorship of The Vessel of God and Boyd Rice's working habits with regard to scholarly writing.

Rice was involved in creating a Tiki bar called Tiki Boyd's at the East Coast Bar in Denver, Colorado. Rice decorated the entire establishment out of his own pocket due to his fondness of Tiki culture, asking an open tab at the bar in return. Rice has long expressed a love of Tiki culture, in contrast to the other elements of his public persona.

Tiki Boyd's was given its name in his honor. Due to disagreements between Rice and the owners, Rice pulled out of the deal and reclaimed all of his Tiki decorations. The future of the bar as it remains now is uncertain. Rice plans to re-establish another Tiki Bar elsewhere in Denver.

October 26, 2018, the teen magazine Galore premiered a music video for the song "Resort Beyond the Last Resort" by the band Collapsing Scenery that Rice starred in. The video was directed by Kansas Bowling and parodies Boyd's essay from Answer Me! "Revolt Against Penis Envy". In the video Rice goes to Casa Bonita in Denver and then is drugged and raped by a woman.

Music
Rice creates music under his own name, as well as under the moniker of NON and with contributors under various other project names.

Early sound experiments
Rice started creating experimental noise recordings in 1975, drawing on his interest in tape machines and bubblegum pop sung by female vocalists such as Little Peggy March and Ginny Arnell. One of his earliest efforts consisted entirely of a loop of every time Lesley Gore sang the word "cry". After initially creating recordings simply for his own listening, he later started to give performances, and eventually make records. His musical project NON grew out of these early experiments; he reportedly selected the name because "it implies everything and nothing".

Techniques and implementations
From his earliest recordings, Rice has experimented with both sound and the medium through which that sound is conveyed. His methods of expanding upon the listening possibilities for recorded music were simple. On his second seven-inch, he had 2–4 extra holes punched into the record for "multi axial rotation". Another early LP was titled Play at Any Speed. While working exclusively with vinyl, he employed locked grooves that allowed listeners to create their own music. He was one of the first artists, after John Cage, to treat turntables as instruments and developed various techniques for scratching. Rice has been treating sounds from vinyl recordings as early as 1975.

NON
Under the name NON, originally with second member Robert Turman, Rice has recorded several seminal noise music albums, and collaborated with experimental music/dark folk artists like Current 93, Death in June and Rose McDowall. Most of his music has been released on the Mute Records label. Rice has also collaborated with Frank Tovey of Fad Gadget, Tony Wakeford of Sol Invictus and Michael Jenkins Moynihan of Blood Axis. His later albums have often been explicitly conceptual.

On Might! (1995), Rice layers portions of Ragnar Redbeard's Social Darwinist harangue, Might Is Right over sound beds of looped noise and manipulated frequencies. 1997's God & Beast explores the intersection in the soul of man's physical and spiritual natures over the course of an album that alternates abrasive soundscapes with passages of tranquility.

In 2006, Rice returned to the studio to record raw vocal sound sources for a collaboration with Industrial, modern primitive percussionist/ethnomusicologist Z'EV. In addition, he and long-time friend of twenty years Giddle Partridge planned an album titled LOVE/LOVE-BANG/BANG!, under the band name of Giddle & Boyd. After the limited edition release of a bubblegum pink, heart-shaped vinyl E.P. titled, Going Steady With Peggy Moffitt. In early 2010, Rice announced that he and Giddle Partridge would focus on solo projects/albums for the time being.

Crowd control
Early NON performances were designed to offer choice to audience members who might otherwise expect only a prefabricated and totally passive entertainment experience. Rice has stated that he considers his performances to be "de-indoctrination rites". Rice has performed using a shoe polisher, the "rotoguitar" (an electric guitar with an electric fan on it), and other homemade instruments. He has also used found sounds, played at a volume just below the threshold of pain, to entice his audiences to endure his high decibel sound experiments.

Rice coupled his aural assaults with psychological torture on audiences in The Hague, the Netherlands, by shining in their faces exceedingly bright lights that were deliberately placed just out of reach. As their frustration mounted, Rice states that he:

Art
After dropping out of high school at the age of 17, Rice began an in-depth study of early 20th-century art movements, producing his own abstract black and white paintings and experimental photographs. Early on, he met European art historian and gallery owner Arturo Schwarz, with whom he began a long correspondence. Schwarz, a biographer of Duchamp and Man Ray, encouraged Rice to pursue his art, no matter what. And he did. Though he would later shift his focus to sound, he has never stopped creating visual art and has given a number of one man shows over the years.

Photography
In the mid-1970s Rice devoted a great deal of time to experimental photography, developing a process by which he could produce "photographs of things which don't exist". He had a one-man show of the photos in the early 1980s at Richard Peterson's Pink & Pearl Gallery in San Diego, which was documented in the local press, the San Diego Union and Evening Tribune. He has never revealed the means by which he made these photos, and has stated publicly that the secret will go to the grave with him. Some of these photos can be seen in his book Standing in Two Circles (Creation Press, 2008).

Writings
Over the years, Boyd Rice's writings have been translated into at least six languages. His collected writings were published in 2008 by Creation Press. A French language edition followed on Camion Noir.

In 2009, his book NO was published by Heartworm Press. This was widely regarded as a book defining Rice's personal philosophy. Rice defined the book as merely a "laundry list" of things he didn't believe in. He later stated in an interview with WFMU's Beware of the Blog, "sometimes the things you don't believe are more important than what you do believe".

In October 2011, Heartworm Press published Rice's Twilight Man, a noir memoir about his life in 1980s San Francisco.

Controversy

In 1989, Rice and Bob Heick of the white nationalist American Front organization were photographed for Sassy wearing uniforms and brandishing knives. While Rice would later recall it as a prank, the photo has caused boycotts and protests at many of Rice's appearances. When asked if he regrets the photo, Rice stated, "I don't care. I don't think I ever made a wrong move. The bad stuff is just good. America loves its villains."

More controversy has resulted because of Rice's appearance on Race and Reason, a public-access television cable TV show hosted by white supremacist Tom Metzger. Rice has claimed not to be a Nazi in numerous interviews whilst his friend Rose McDowall has claimed he has never said anything racist nor endorsed Nazism to her. However, Stewart Home has claimed that Rice is a supporter of Nazism. Boyd Rice was associated with Church of Satan founder Anton LaVey and has collaborated with Adam Parfrey, who was Jewish.

On August 8, 1988, Boyd Rice was among the performers at 8/8/88 at the Strand Theater in San Francisco, which was locally heavily advertised and sold out, billed as "An Evening of Apocalyptic Delight". Rice appeared with the band Radio Werewolf as well as Zeena Lavey, daughter of the founder of the Church of Satan, and Adam Parfrey. Rice reports that, "Minutes after they took the stage in their Teutonic garb, the audience fled in droves" though others present that night did not see anyone leaving.

Discography

Filmography

Film
 Pranks! TV! (1986, VHS) (directed by V. Vale), RE/Search Publications
 Tyranny of the Beat (1991), Mute Records
 Speak of the Devil (1995, VHS) (about Anton LaVey, directed by Nick Bougas), Wavelength Video
 Boyd Rice Documentary, Part One (1994), Joel Haertling
 Boyd Rice Documentary, Part Two (1998), Joel Haertling
 Pearls Before Swine (1999) (directed by Richard Wolstencroft)
 Nixing the Twist (2000, DVD) (directed by Frank Kelly Rich), High Crime Films
 The Many Moods of Boyd Rice (2002, VHS), Predatory Instinct Productions
 Church of Satan Interview Archive (2003, DVD), Purging Talon
 Baptism by Fire (2004, DVD) (live performance in Bologna, Italy), NERO2 
 Frank Tovey by Fad Gadget (2006) (documentary), Mute Records
 Iconoclast (2011) (directed by Larry Wessel), iconoclastmovie.com
 Modern Drunkard (directed by Frank Kelly Rich)
 In Satan's Name (BBC documentary by director Antony Thomas)
 In Satan's Name (Bob Larson's 31-episode television series), Trinity Broadcasting Network
Resort Beyond the Last Resort (music video directed by Kansas Bowling), Collapsing Scenery

Performance
 Live in Osaka (DVD) (features a concert performance from Osaka, Japan in 1989, with Michael Moynihan, Tony Wakeford, Douglas P. and Rose McDowall; also includes Rice's films Invocation (One) and Black Sun)

Print
 Perpetual Permutation Poetry, International Artist's Cooperative, (1976)
 Painted Black, Carl Rashke
 Tape Delay, SAF Publishing, (1987)
 Pop Void, Pop Void Publications, (1987)
 RE/Search No. 6: Industrial Culture Handbook, RE/Search Publications (1983)
 RE/Search No. 10: Incredibly Strange Films: A Guide to Deviant Films, RE/Search Publications (1986) (joint author)
 RE/Search No. 11: Pranks!. RE/Search Publications (1986)
 The Manson File edited by Nikolas Schreck, Amok Press (1988)
 Apocalypse Culture: Expanded & Revised Edition edited by Adam Parfrey, Feral House, (1990)
 ANSWER Me!, issue No. 3 (1993)
 ANSWER Me!, issue No. 4 (1994)
 Death in June: le livre Brun, Camion Blanc, (1994)
 Death in June: Misery & Purity, Jara Press, (1995)
 The Exit Collection, Tacit, (1998)
 Taboo: The Art of Tiki, Outre Press, (1999)
 Lucifer Rising, Plexus Publishing, (1999)
 Cinema Contra Cinema, Fringecore, (1999)
 Apocalypse Culture II, edited by Adam Parfrey, Feral House (2000)
 Paranoia: The Conspiracy Reader, issue 32, Spring 2003.
 The Book of Lies, Disinformation Press, (2003)
 100 Artists See Satan, Last Gasp Press, (2004)
 The Vessel of God, Terra Fria, (2005)
 .45 Dangerous Minds, Creation Press, (2005)
 Art That Kills, Creation Press, (2006)
 Noise Music: A History, Continuum International Publishing Group, (2007)
 The Book of Satanic Quotations, Purging Talon Press, (2008)
 Bubblegum & Sunshine Pop, Les Cahiers du Rock, (2008)
 Iron Youth Reader, Underworld Amusements, (2008)
 Standing in Two Circles: Les Ecrits de Boyd Rice, (French translation) edited by Brian M. Clark Camion Noir, (2009)
 Standing in Two Circles: The Collected Works of Boyd Rice, edited by Brian M. Clark, CTBKS, (2008)
 No, Heartworm Press, (2009)
 Death in June: Hidden Behind the Runes, Aldo Clementi, (2010)
 Mondo Movies, Baazar & Co., (2010)
 Charles Manson: Le Guru du Rock, Camion Noir, (2010)
 Twilight Man, Heartworm Press, (2011)
 Vlad the Impaler, Ian Allan, (2011)
 No, Expanded and revised edition Heartworm Press
 Death in June Songbook

References

Further reading
Chad Hensley. "Non Sense: An Interview with Boyd Rice". Esoterra: The Journal of Extreme Culture 9 (Fall/Winter 2000), pp. 12–17.

Arvo Zylo. "Have A Nice Day: An Interview with Boyd Rice". WFMU's Beware of the Blog (May 19, 2011), http://blog.wfmu.org/freeform/2011/05/a-conversation-with-boyd-rice.html; retrieved October 10, 2017.

1956 births
Living people
American noise musicians
American industrial musicians
American sound artists
American LaVeyan Satanists
Mute Records artists
American male writers
People from Lemon Grove, California
Death in June members